The social structure of the United Kingdom has historically been highly influenced by the concept of social class, which continues to affect British society today. British society, like its European neighbours and most societies in world history, was traditionally (before the Industrial Revolution) divided hierarchically within a system that involved the hereditary transmission of occupation, social status and political influence. Since the advent of industrialisation, this system has been in a constant state of revision, and new factors other than birth (for example, education) are now a greater part of creating identity in Britain.

Although definitions of social class in the United Kingdom vary and are highly controversial, most are influenced by factors of wealth, occupation, and education. Until the Life Peerages Act 1958, the Parliament of the United Kingdom was organised on a class basis, with the House of Lords representing the hereditary upper class and the House of Commons representing everybody else. The British monarch is usually viewed as being at the top of the social class structure.

British society has experienced significant change since the Second World War, including an expansion of higher education and home ownership, a shift towards a service-dominated economy, mass immigration, a changing role for women and a more individualistic culture. These changes have had a considerable impact on the social landscape. However, claims that the UK has become a classless society have frequently been met with skepticism. Research has shown that social status in the United Kingdom is influenced by, although separate from, social class.

This change in terminology corresponded to a general decrease in significance ascribed to hereditary characteristics, and increase in the significance of wealth and income as indicators of position in the social hierarchy.

The "class system" in the United Kingdom is widely studied in academia but no definition of the word class is universally agreed to. Some scholars may adopt the Marxist view of class where persons are classified by their relationship to means of production, as owners or as workers, which is the most important factor in that person's social rank.  Alternatively, Max Weber developed a three-component theory of stratification under which "a person’s power can be shown in the social order through their status, in the economic order through their class, and in the political order through their party. The biggest current study of social class in the United Kingdom is the Great British Class Survey.  Besides these academic models, there are myriad popular explanations of class in Britain.  In the work Class, Jilly Cooper quotes a shopkeeper on the subject of bacon: "When a woman asks for back I call her 'madam'; when she asks for streaky I call her 'dear'."

History

The United Kingdom never experienced the sudden dispossession of the estates of the nobility, which occurred in much of Europe after the French Revolution or in the early 20th century, and the British nobility, in so far as it existed as a distinct social class, integrated itself with those with new wealth derived from commercial and industrial sources more comfortably than in most of Europe. Opportunities resulting from consistent economic growth and the expanding British Empire also enabled some from much poorer backgrounds (generally men who had managed to acquire some education) to rise through the class system.

The historian David Cannadine sees the period around 1880 as a peak after which the position of the old powerful families declined rapidly, from a number of causes, reaching a nadir in the years after the Second World War, symbolised by the widespread destruction of country houses.  However their wealth, if not their political power, has rebounded strongly since the 1980s, benefiting from greatly increased values of the land and fine art which many owned in quantity.

Meanwhile, the complex British middle classes had also been enjoying a long period of growth and increasing prosperity, and achieving political power at the national level to a degree unusual in Europe. They avoided the strict stratification of many Continental middle classes, and formed a large and amorphous group closely connected at their edges with both the gentry and aristocracy and the labouring classes. In particular the great financial centre of the City of London was open to outsiders to an unusual degree, and continually expanding and creating new employment.

The British working class, on the other hand, was not notable in Europe for prosperity, and early modern British travellers often remarked on the high standard of living of the farmworkers and artisans of the Netherlands, though the peasantry in other countries such as France were remarked on as poorer than their English equivalents.  Living standards certainly improved greatly over the period, more so in England than other parts of the United Kingdom, but the Industrial Revolution was marked by extremely harsh working conditions and poor housing until about the middle of the 19th century.

Formal classifications

Early modern
At the time of the formation of Great Britain in 1707, England and Scotland had similar class-based social structures. Some basic categories covering most of the British population around 1500 to 1700 are as follows. This social model was in force until the 20th century.

20th century

The social grade classification created by the National Readership Survey over 50 years ago achieved widespread usage during the 20th century in marketing and government reports and statistics.

21st century

The UK Office for National Statistics (ONS) produced a new socio-economic classification in 2001. The reason was to provide a more comprehensive and detailed classification to take newer employment patterns into account.

Great British Class Survey

On 2 April 2013 analysis of the results of a survey, which was conducted by the BBC in 2011 and developed in collaboration with academic experts, was published online in the journal Sociology. The results released were based on a survey of 160,000 residents of the United Kingdom most of whom lived in England and described themselves as "white." Class was defined and measured according to the amount and kind of economic, cultural, and social resources, "capitals", reported. Economic capital was defined as income and assets; cultural capital as amount and type of cultural interests and activities, and social capital as the quantity and social status of their friends, family and personal and business contacts. This theoretical framework was inspired by that of Pierre Bourdieu, who published his theory of social distinction in 1979.

Results
Analysis of the survey revealed seven classes: a wealthy "elite;" a prosperous salaried "middle class" consisting of professionals and managers; a class of technical experts; a class of ‘new affluent’ workers, and at the lower levels of the class structure, in addition to an ageing traditional working class, a ‘precariat’ characterised by very low levels of capital, and a group of emergent service workers. The fracturing of the middle sectors of the social structure into distinguishable factions separated by generational, economic, cultural, and social characteristics was considered notable by the authors of the research.

Elite
Members of the elite class are the top 6% of British society with very high economic capital (particularly savings), high social capital, and very 'highbrow' cultural capital. Occupations such as chief executive officers, IT and telecommunications directors, marketing and sales directors; functional managers and directors, solicitors, barristers and judges, financial managers, higher education teachers, dentists, doctors and advertising and public relations directors were strongly represented. However, those in the established and 'acceptable' professions, such as academia, law and medicine are more traditional upper middle class identifiers, with IT and sales being the preserve of the economic if not social middle class.

Established middle class
Members of the established middle class, about 25% of British society, reported high economic capital, high status of mean social contacts, and both high highbrow and high emerging cultural capital. Well-represented occupations included electrical engineers, occupational therapists, social workers, midwives, environmental professionals, quality assurance and regulatory professionals, town planning officials, and special needs teaching professionals.

Technical middle class
The technical middle class, about 6% of British society, shows high economic capital, very high status of social contacts, but relatively few contacts reported, and moderate cultural capital. Occupations represented include medical radiographers, aircraft pilots, pharmacists, natural and social science professionals and physical scientists, and business, research, and administrative positions.

New affluent workers
New affluent workers, about 15% of British society, show moderately good economic capital, relatively poor status of social contacts, though highly varied, and moderate highbrow but good emerging cultural capital. Occupations include electricians and electrical fitters; postal workers; retail cashiers and checkout operatives; plumbers and heating and ventilation technicians; sales and retail assistants; housing officers; kitchen and catering assistants;  quality assurance technicians.

Traditional working class
The traditional working class, about 14% of British society, shows relatively poor economic capital, but some housing assets, few social contacts, and low highbrow and emerging cultural capital. Typical occupations include electrical and electronics technicians; care workers; cleaners; van drivers; electricians; residential, day, and domiciliary care.

Emergent service sector
The emergent service sector, about 19% of British society, shows relatively poor economic capital, but reasonable household income, moderate social contacts, high emerging (but low highbrow) cultural capital. Typical occupations include bar staff, chefs, nursing auxiliaries and assistants, assemblers and routine operatives, care workers, elementary storage occupations, customer service occupations, and musicians.

Precariat 
The precariat, about 15% of British society, shows poor economic capital, and the lowest scores on every other criterion. Although some members of this class are unemployed, many hold jobs.  Members of this class include about 6% of all cleaners, 5% of all van drivers, 4% of all care workers, 4% of all carpenters and joiners, 3% of all caretakers, 3% of all leisure and travel service occupations, 3% of all shopkeepers and proprietors, and 2% of all retail cashiers.

Informal classifications

Underclass

The term "underclass" is used to refer to those people who are "chronically unemployed", and in many instances have been for generations. The term was invented in the US in the late 20th Century. Evidence could not be found through field research to support the notion of an ‘underclass’ with a separate sub-culture amongst the long-term unemployed, yet it has become a key word in the British lexicon due to the essays that the American New-Right sociologist Charles Murray was invited to write in 1989 for the Sunday Times.

There is a contention that there are homologies between the meaning context and tenor of the abusive word "chav" and the term "underclass" in media discourses: the obvious difference being the former relates to supposed dispositions of a social class in consumption and the later to difficulties of a social class in productive labour relations. The educational special adviser, Charlie Taylor follows Michael Gove in conceiving of an "educational underclass", and felt the majority of those involved in the 2011 England riots could be considered to be members. The BBC journalist, Mark Easton, felt that, in the justificatory responses he heard in the aftermath of those riots, it would be easy to concur with the politician Iain Duncan Smith's 2008 theory of "an underclass" that exhibited "creeping expansion".

Working class

Unskilled and semi-skilled working class
It may be that the unskilled working class once worked as manual labourers. It may be that they typically left school as soon as legally permissible and it may be that many were not able to take part in higher education.

It may be that be that many would go on to work in semi-skilled and unskilled jobs in raw materials extraction/processing, in assembly and in machine shops of Britain's major car factories, steel mills, coal mines, foundries and textile mills in the highly industrialised cities and pit towns and villages in the West Midlands, North of England, South Wales and the Scottish Lowlands. However, since the mid-1970s and early-1980s, some might contend that de-industrialisation has shattered many of these communities, resulting, some might contend, in a complete deterioration in quality of life and a reversal in rising living standards for the industrial working class. It may be that many dropped in status to join the working poor and it may be that many fell into permanent reliance on social security. It may be that some dropped out altogether and joined the black market economy, and it may be that a few managed, perhaps through geographic fortune of other industries in the local area, to ascend to the lower middle class.

It has been argued that with the decline in manufacturing and increase in the service sector, lower-paid office workers are effectively working-class. Call centres in particular, have sprung up in former centres of industry. However, since the early-2000s; there has been a trend for many call centres to close down in the UK and outsource their jobs to India and other jurisdictions, as part of cost-cutting measures.

The Mosaic 2010 groups where the proportion of residents in NRS social grade D was rated "high" in the 2010 Mosaic Index are "Residents with sufficient incomes in right-to-buy social housing" and "Families in low-rise social housing with high levels of benefit need".

During the post-war era, white working-class Britons witnessed a big rise in their standard of living. As noted by Denys Blakeway in 2008:

"The white working-class have prospered hugely since the war. They have experienced unparalleled growth in disposable income and today they are now richer than their parents and grandparents could ever have imagined.  There are shared values in white working-class culture but I think it is incredibly difficult to put your finger on exactly what it is that defines "white working-class" because a lot of them are shared by the middle class, such as football and the pub."

Skilled working class
This class of people would be in skilled industrial jobs or tradesmen, traditionally in the construction and manufacturing industry, but in recent decades showing entrepreneurial development as the stereotypical white van man, or self-employed contractors. It may be that these people would speak in regional accents and it may be that they would have completed craft apprenticeships rather than a university education. The only Mosaic 2010 group where the proportion of residents in NRS social grade C2 was rated "high" in the 2010 Mosaic Index is "Residents with sufficient incomes in right-to-buy social housing".

An example of what the BBC described as a "normal, working-class Boltonian" was Fred Dibnah, a small-scale company director in the construction industry (and therefore also an example of the small employer class, rather than the routine class, in NS-SEC). A fictional example of a mid-century skilled working man, from the literary traditional of the working-class novel, is Arthur Seaton, in the novel Saturday Night and Sunday Morning. A lathe operator at a bicycle factory, he regards his father's apparently subservient generation with contempt, and at the close of the novel (made explicit in the film version) plans to buy his own home.

Middle class

Lower middle class

The British lower middle class, when described historically, primarily consisted of office workers: when describing class segregation of housing in the Nottingham of 1901, clerks, bookkeepers, estate agents and teachers are described as having been lower middle class. Researchers today sometimes equate NRS social grade C1, "Supervisory, clerical and junior managerial, administrative and professional", with "lower middle class".

In the nineteenth century, the middle and lower middle classes were able to live in suburbs due to the development of horse-drawn omnibuses and railways. One radical Liberal politician (Charles Masterman), writing in 1909 used "the Middle Classes" and "the suburbans" synonymously. In the early twenty-first century, there were no Mosaic 2010 geodemographic groups where the proportion of residents in NRS social grade C1 was rated as "high" or "low" in the 2010 Index; it was rated as "average" in all Mosaic groups, whether these were of a suburban, rural, city or small-town nature.

Some researchers conceive of the lower middle class as consisting of those who work in lower-grade service-sector managerial jobs or semi-professions (the lower-grade service class in Oesch 2006) and small business owners.  Prior to the expansion in higher education from the 1960s onwards, members of this class generally did not have a university education.

Members of the lower middle class typically speak in local accents, although relatively mild. Votes in this area are split and minority parties will have a stronger proportion.

Middle class
The middle class in Britain often consists of people with tertiary education and may have been educated at either state or private schools.

Typical jobs include: accountants, architects, solicitors, surveyors, social workers, teachers, managers, specialist IT workers, engineers, doctors, nurses and civil servants.

The Middle Class, at least in the 19th Century, had a more secure income than the Working Class and accumulated unspent income which they could channel into investments.

Members of the middle class are often politically and socially engaged (a Mori poll in 2005 found 70% of grades AB voted at the 2005 general election compared to 54% of grades DE). Education is greatly valued by the middle classes: they will make every effort to ensure their children get offered a place at university; they may send their children to a  private school, employ a home tutor for out of school hours so their child learns at a faster rate, or go to great lengths to get their children enrolled into good state or selective grammar schools; such as moving house into the catchment area.

They also value culture and make up a significant proportion of the book-buying and theatre-going public. They typically read broadsheet newspapers rather than tabloids. The only Mosaic 2010 geodemographic type where the proportion of residents in NRS social grade B was rated as "high" in the 2010 index was "People living in brand new residential developments".  The middle classes particularly of England and Wales are often popularly referred to as "Middle England". Jilly Cooper is a self-described "upper middle-class" writer who wrote an extended humour sketch imagining the lives of different types of people drawing on prejudiced tropes and biases relating to social class, which she called "Class, A view from Middle England".

Upper middle class

The upper middle class in Britain broadly consists of people who were born into families which have traditionally possessed high incomes, although this group is defined more by family background than by job or income. Although RP is not exclusive to any social class, some members of this stratum, in England, traditionally used General British Pronunciation natively.

The upper middle class are traditionally educated at private schools, preferably one of the "major" or "minor" "public schools" which themselves often have pedigrees going back for hundreds of years and charge fees of as much as £44,000 per year per pupil (as of 2022).

A minority of upper-middle-class families may also have ancestry that directly connects them to the upper classes. Armorial bearings in the form of an escutcheon may denote such past status. A lesser status historically directly relevant to the upper middle class is that of squire or lord of the manor, however, these property rights are no longer  prevalent.

Although such categorisations are not precise, popular contemporary examples of upper-middle-class people may include Boris Johnson, Catherine, Princess of Wales, David Cameron, and Matthew Pinsent (athlete).

Upper class

The British "upper class" is statistically very small and consists of the peerage, gentry and hereditary landowners, among others. Those in possession of a hereditary title (for example, a dukedom, a marquessate, an earldom, a viscountcy, a barony, a baronetcy, or a Scottish lordship of parliament) are typically members of the upper class, while those in possession or right to a coat of arms are typically at least members of the upper middle class.

Traditionally, upper class children were brought up at home by a nanny for the first few years of their lives, and then home schooled by private tutors. From the late-nineteenth century, it became increasingly popular for upper-class families to mimic the middle classes in sending their children to public schools, which had been predominantly founded to serve the educational needs of the middle class.

Nowadays, when children are old enough, they may attend a prep school or pre-preparatory school. Moving into secondary education, it is still commonplace for upper-class children to attend a public school, although it is not unheard of for certain families to send their children to state schools. Continuing education goals can vary from family to family; it may, in part, be based on the educational history of the family.  In the past, both the British Army and Royal Navy have been the institutions of choice.  Equally, the clergy, as well as academia, particularly within the arts and humanities divisions of Britain's oldest and most prestigious universities (Oxbridge), have been traditional career paths amongst the upper class - indeed until 1840 the majority of Oxbridge graduates were destined for ordination.

Sociolinguistics of Great Britain

Received Pronunciation
Received Pronunciation, also known as RP or BBC English, was a term introduced as way of defining standard English, but the accent has acquired a certain prestige from being associated with the middle (and above) classes in the South East, the wealthiest part of England. Use of RP by people from the "regions" outside the South East can be indicative of a certain educational background, such as public school or elocution lessons.

"The Queen's English" or "King's English" was once a synonym for RP. However, Queen Elizabeth II, King Charles III, and some other older members of the aristocracy are now perceived as speaking, or having spoken, in a way that is both more old-fashioned and higher class than "general" RP. Phoneticians call this accent "Conservative Received Pronunciation".  The Queen's pronunciation, however, also changed over the years. The results of the Harrington & al. study can be interpreted either as a change, in a range not normally perceptible, in the direction of the mainstream RP of a reference corpus of 1980s newsreaders, or showing subtle changes that might well have been influenced by the vowels of Estuary English.

BBC English was also a synonym for RP; people seeking a career in acting or broadcasting once learnt RP as a matter of course if they did not speak it already.  However, the BBC and other broadcasters are now much more willing to use (indeed desire to use) regional accents.

U and non-U

Language and writing style have consistently been one of the most reliable indicators of class, although pronunciation did not become such an indicator until the late-nineteenth century. The variations between the language employed by the upper classes and non-upper classes have, perhaps, been best documented by linguistics Professor Alan Ross's 1954 article on U and non-U English usage, with "U" representing upper and upper middle class vocabulary of the time, and "Non-U" representing lower middle class vocabulary. The discussion was furthered in Noblesse Oblige and featured contributions from, among others, Nancy Mitford. The debate was revisited in the mid-1970s, in a publication by Debrett's called U and Non-U Revisited. Ross also contributed to this volume, and it is remarkable to notice how little the language (amongst other factors) changed in the passing of a quarter of a century.

English regional dialect

In England, the upper class or prestige dialect is almost always a form of RP; however, some areas have their "own" prestige dialect, distinct from both RP and the working-class dialect of the region.

England has a wider variety of regional dialects than larger English-speaking countries such as Australia or the United States, and many of England's dialect have working class or lower middle class connotations.  However, there is a tradition of linguistic study of dialects in England and many members of the middle classes, such as Alexander John Ellis (author of On Early English Pronunciation, Part V) and Harold Orton (co-founder of the Survey of English Dialects), were fascinated by the linguistics of working-class speech.  Arthur Balfour, a 19th-century politician and an aristocrat, gave a large financial donation for the production of the English Dialect Dictionary, compiled by the working-class Joseph Wright.

Yorkshire dialect the accent of Yorkshire with some considerable variation between the north, south, east and west of the region.
Manchester dialect the accent and dialect of Manchester and the surrounding area. 
Scouse – The accent and dialect of Liverpool, especially strong in Merseyside's working-class population.
Barrovian, the dialect spoken in Barrow-in-Furness in Cumbria.
Lancashire dialect refers to the dialect in the traditional county of Lancashire, outside Manchester, Liverpool and Barrow.
Brummie – The accent and dialect of Birmingham.
Potteries dialect the accent and dialect of Stoke-on-Trent and surround Potteries area.
The Black Country dialect of the West Midlands, which is similar to but distinctive from Brummie.
Geordie – An accent and dialect of North-East England, particularly the Tyneside area.
 Mackem – An accent and dialect of Sunderland and surrounding areas.
West Country dialects - a variety of similar, yet noticeably different accents and dialects in the South West of England, such as the Bristolian dialect
Cockney is traditionally the working-class accent of East London. It also has distinct variations in grammar and vocabulary.
The London accent is a more broadly defined working and lower middle class accent than Cockney.
Estuary English – A working-class and lower middle class accent from South-East England, basically a milder (closer to R.P.)  form of the London accent.  The term was commonly used in the media in the 1990s, although the media depiction was criticised by academics such as Peter Roach  and Peter Trudgill and the term is now less common.  In this region, there was previously Essex dialect, Kentish dialect, Sussex dialect and Surrey dialect, but these are now rarely heard except amongst very elderly residents.
Mockney is a term used in popular media for a deliberate affectation of the working-class London (Cockney) accent by middle-class people to gain "street credibility". However, phoneticians regard the infusion of Cockney features into Received Pronunciation among younger speakers to be a natural process.
 Multicultural London English (abbreviated MLE), colloquially called Jafaican, is a dialect (and/or sociolect) of English that emerged in the late-twentieth century, and is used mainly by young, inner-city, working-class people in inner London. It is said to contain many elements from the languages of the Caribbean (Jamaica and Trinidad and Tobago), South Asia (Indian subcontinent), and West Africa, as well as remnants of traditional Cockney.
Norfolk English
Suffolk English

Heraldry, aristocracy and social class
Historically and still today, the traditional upper class is identified as the aristocracy, and social climbers tend to aspire for their descendants to be eventually absorbed by it. The aristocracy can be broadly divided into two categories: the peerage and the gentry. The peerage consists of Peers of the Realm (i.e., holders of the substantive aristocratic titles Baron, Lord of Parliament, Viscount, Earl, Marquess or Duke) and, arguably, their wives and immediate families. English Peers of the Realm and Scottish representative peers were previously entitled to sit in the House of Lords by right, now a smaller number are elected to sit in the Lords by fellow peers. Baronets, Knights, Lairds, Esquires and Gentlemen form the gentry. Members of the gentry enjoy preferential social status but no significant legal privileges. Legally considered "commoners," they could stand for election to the House of Commons. 
Substantive titles are distinct from courtesy styles of address, more so in the United Kingdom than in some continental systems. In the United Kingdom only the peer is said to be titled, while his wife and children may enjoy courtesy titles or styles. For example, a peer's eldest son may use one of the peer's subsidiary titles (if any) by courtesy but is not considered the substantive holder of that title. Younger children my also enjoy courtesy styles such as "Lord," "Lady," or "The Honourable." Outside of the peer's immediate family, male-line descendants of a previous holder of the peerage (e.g., a male-line cousin) are generally considered to belong to the upper class. A noted example would be Winston Churchill, whose father Lord Randolph Churchill, was a younger son of John Spencer-Churchill, 7th Duke of Marlborough. Lord Randolph carried a courtesy title but was legally a commoner and therefore sat in the House of Commons. Being further removed from the dukedom, Winston Churchill was not entitled to any title or style by birthright but, as the grandson (and subsequently nephew and cousin, as the title descended) of a duke, was still considered a member of the upper class. 
An English citizen with arms registered in the College of Arms, or a Scottish citizen in the Lyon Court, can be referred to as armigerous and is considered (at least) a member of the untitled nobility, a Gentleman. Any British citizen can apply for arms from their respective authority but only those of sufficient social standing, those who are already Gentlemen through means other than armigerousness, would be granted arms. Typically, wealth alone is not seen as a reason to grant arms. Arms in and of themselves are imperfectly aligned with social status, in that many of high status will have no right to arms whilst, on the other hand, those entitled to arms by descent can include branches of families from anywhere on the social scale.

Nevertheless, a right to bear arms under the Law of Arms is, by definition, linked either to the personal acquisition of social status, inspiring application for a personal grant of arms, or to descent from a person who did so in the past. Rightly or wrongly, therefore, the use of a coat of arms is linked to social prestige. Technically, a grant of arms is a confirmation of gentility or nobility, which must be acquired either through a military commission or one of the offices that traditionally come with personal gentility, or through extraordinary achievements or proving a lifestyle befitting to the traditional gentry. Nevertheless, as many people who would not be considered traditional landed gentry (yet) are granted arms, it can be said that a grant of arms is comparable to an act of ennoblement as it is practiced in Liechtenstein, Belgium or Spain, despite coming not from the Monarch directly but from one of the two supreme heraldic officers - Garter King of Arms, or Lord Lyon King of Arms.

Britain is unique in the fact that it is possible to acquire social nobility - a kind of noblesse d'apparence - solely by demonstrating social standing and an appropriate lifestyle, and thus, the rank of gentleman can be accorded to a non-armiger not holding a traditionally ennobling office, something that generally has been made impossible on the Continent at the end of the Middle Ages. Until arms are granted, gentility can be challenged and derogated if social status is lost.

In the early twentieth century, it was argued by heraldic writers such as Arthur Charles Fox-Davies that only those with a right to a coat of arms could correctly be described (if men) as gentlemen and of noble status; however, even at the time this argument was controversial, and it was rejected by other writers such as Oswald Barron and Horace Round. Rather, it can be said that not all gentlemen are armigers, but all armigers are (at least) gentlemen.

Thus, apart from receiving a peerage, baronetcy or a knighthood, it is possible to grow into the traditional British nobility by maintaining status for several generations ("It takes three generations to make a gentleman") or extraordinary achievement, usually in combination with acquiring a traditional country house with land. The process is completed by the acquisition of arms.

In the Order of Malta, where proof of technical nobility is a requirement of certain grades of membership, British members must still base their proof upon an ancestral right to a coat of arms. CILANE, the European federation of nobility associations, also considers all British armigers as noble and the granting of arms in Britain as an act of ennoblement or confirmation of nobility.

The relationship between armigerousness and nobility is evidenced in frequent intermarriage between the peerage and the untitled gentry, and by the fact that the younger son of a younger son of a younger son of a Duke and an armiger with a new grant of arms share the same rank - that of gentleman.

Because of the unique British system of aristocracy, it can be said that Britain lacks an established explicitly non-noble upper class (haute bourgeoisie or patriciate), as families that would fall into this category on the Continent are absorbed into the aristocracy in Britain.

Until the 20th century, feudal titles - Lordships of the Manor in England and Feudal Baronies in Scotland - were largely owned by the traditional nobility, and many are still in the hands of the landed gentry, of Peers and even of the Royal Family. They are incorporeal hereditaments just like hereditary peerages, baronetcies and coats of arms but can, unlike them, be freely bequeathed to an appointed heir or even sold. In the late 20th century, it became fashionable for foreign businessmen without a social or historical connection to the British upper class, often without any connection to Britain at all, to purchase them solely with the intent to use the title. This development was accelerated by the Abolition of Feudal Tenure Act in Scotland, which came into force in 2004 and detached Scottish feudal baronies from the manorial houses, the rights and the lands they were attached to (an analogous separation had already occurred in England centuries before). Thus, feudal titles can not be regarded a mark of nobility by themselves anymore, unless they are held under the same conditions as they were in feudal society.

Criticisms
In 1941, George Orwell wrote that Britain was "the most class-ridden society under the sun."

In an interview in 1975 Helmut Schmidt, the then Chancellor of West Germany, stated that:

Later in the same interview, Schmidt noted that

See also
 British nobility
 Landed Gentry
 British Royal Family
 The Forsyte Saga
 Hereditary peer
 Income in the United Kingdom
 Mosaic (geodemography) – system designed to classify Britain by postcode, into 11 main groups and 61 types.
 Peerage
 Poverty in the United Kingdom
 Toffs and Toughs

UK social stereotypes
 Chav, charver (South/North-East England and Yorkshire), scally (North West England), Ned (Scotland) or Spide (Northern Ireland)
 Essex man
 Hooray Henry
 Plebs
 Rah
 Sloane Ranger
 Toff
 White van man

Citations

General and cited references 
 Jilly Cooper. Class, A view from Middle England, Eyre Methuen, 1979, 
 Kate Fox. Watching the English, Nicholas Brealey Pub., 2004,

Further reading
 Benson, John. The Working Class in Britain 1850–1939 (I. B. Tauris, 2003).
 Bukodi, Erzsébet, et al. "The mobility problem in Britain: new findings from the analysis of birth cohort data." British Journal of Sociology 66.1 (2015): 93–117. online
 Giddens, Anthony. "Elites in the British class structure." Sociological Review 20.3 (1972): 345–372.
 Goldthorpe, John H., and Colin Mills. "Trends in intergenerational class mobility in Britain in the late twentieth century." in Social mobility in Europe (2004): 195–224.
 Goldthorpe, John H., and David Lockwood. "Affluence and the British class structure." Sociological Review 11.2 (1963): 133–163.
 Goldthorpe, John H. "Sociology and Statistics in Britain: The Strange History of Social Mobility Research and Its Latter-Day Consequences." in  Plamena Panayotova  ed., The History of Sociology in Britain (Palgrave Macmillan, 2019). 339–387.
 Gregg, Pauline. A Social and Economic History of Britain: 1760–1950 (1950) online
 Henz, Ursula, and Colin Mills. "Social Class Origin and Assortative Mating in Britain, 1949–2010." Sociology 52.6 (2018): 1217–1236. online
 Holmwood, John, and John Scott, eds. The Palgrave Handbook of Sociology in Britain (Springer, 2014).
 Li, Yaojun, and Anthony Heath. "Class matters: A study of minority and majority social mobility in Britain, 1982–2011." American Journal of Sociology 122.1 (2016): 162–200. online
 Miles, Andrew, and Mike Savage. (2013) The remaking of the British working class, 1840-1940 (Routledge, 2013).

 Savage, Mike. Social class in the 21st century (Penguin UK, 2015).
 Savage, Mike, et al. "A new model of social class? Findings from the BBC’s Great British Class Survey experiment." Sociology 47.2 (2013): 219–250.
 Thompson, E.P. The Making of the English Working Class (1968)

External links
David Cannadine, The Rise and Fall of Class in Britain
JP Somerville, University of Wisconsin page on early modern social class in Britain
Mosaic Geodemographics Summary
Article from The Times on Taste and class
Article from The Times - are we all Middle class now
Article from the Times - Can you buy your way into the Upper Class
Article from the Times
article from Daily Telegraph on social mobility

 
Society of the United Kingdom
Feudalism in the British Isles
Social status